The Montreal Institute for the Deaf and Mute was a boarding school operated by the Clerics of St Viateur between 1848 and 1983 in Montreal, Quebec.

History
The Montreal Institute for the Deaf was founded as L'Institute Catholique des Sourds-Muets (The Catholic School for Deaf Boys) in 1848 in Faubourg Quebec, a neighbourhood in the northeastern corner of Montreal. In 1850, the Institute moved to the Mile End area, at the corner of Boulevard St-Joseph and Rue Saint Dominique in Montreal. By 1887, workshops for teaching the trades such as bookbinding, shoemaking and printing had been built within the school.

In the 1921, the Institute moved to a new building at 7400 Boulevard Saint-Laurent in Montreal. The building is now listed as a heritage building by the City of Montreal.

In 1983, the Institute ceased teaching at the 7400 Boulevard Saint-Laurent location.

The following year, the Institute Catholique des Sourds-Muets changed its name to L'Institut Raymond-Dewar  (English:The Raymond Dewar Institute).

Sexual abuse settlement
In 2012, 60 former students of the Institute filed a class action suit claiming they were sexually abused by priests in the school. The initial class action was joined by other former students, bringing the total number of plaintiffs claiming abuse to 150 students with claims of abuse ranging between 1942 and 1982. The claims by former students were not legally contested by the Clerics of St Viateur. This led to a settlement in 2016 of $30 million from the Clerics of St Viateur and The Raymond Dewar Institute. The settlement was the largest settlement ever awarded for a sexual abuse case in Quebec history. The settlement, authorized in the Superior Court of Quebec, provided for a payment of $20 million from the Canadian Clerics of St. Viateur, and $10 million from The Raymond Dewar Institute, the renamed version of the Institute adopted in 1984.

See also
 Clerics of St Viateur

References

History of Montreal
Schools in Montreal
Schools for the deaf in Canada